David Andrew Macciochi (born 14 January 1972) is an English former professional footballer who played as a winger in the Football League for Brighton & Hove Albion and in the Tippeligaen for Sogndal. He began his career as a trainee with Queens Park Rangers, but never played for their league side.

Career
Macciochi was born in 1972 in Harlow, Essex, and represented Harlow Schools. He spent time at Leyton Orient's Centre of Excellence before joining First Division club Queens Park Rangers as a trainee. He turned professional in 1990, and the following year, signed on loan at Norwegian club Sogndal, for which he made 15 appearances in the 1991 Tippeligaen and scored once, in a 4–2 loss to Viking. Macciochi played reserve-team football for QPR, and scored against Arsenal's reserves in a match that made the back pages of the tabloids when four players, including Arsenal's David O'Leary were sent off, but never appeared for the first team, and was released at the end of the 1991–92 season.

He joined Brighton & Hove Albion in September 1992 on non-contract terms and made two substitute appearances in the Second Division (third tier) before being released. He spent short spells with Kingstonian, Dulwich Hamlet and Whyteleafe before staying with Bishop's Stortford long enough to help them win the 1993–94 Isthmian League Division One title, and then played lower down the non-league ladder for Essex clubs Sawbridgeworth Town and Takeley.

References

1972 births
Living people
Sportspeople from Harlow
English footballers
Association football wingers
Leyton Orient F.C. players
Queens Park Rangers F.C. players
Sogndal Fotball players
Brighton & Hove Albion F.C. players
Kingstonian F.C. players
Dulwich Hamlet F.C. players
Whyteleafe F.C. players
Bishop's Stortford F.C. players
Eliteserien players
English Football League players
Isthmian League players
English expatriate footballers
Expatriate footballers in Norway
English expatriate sportspeople in Norway